Kentucky Route 54 (KY 54) is a  state highway in the U.S. state of Kentucky.

Route Description
The highway, which begins at the intersection of Frederica Street and Parrish Avenue in Owensboro, which is also its junction with Kentucky Route 81 and Kentucky Route 2831 (formerly US 431), begins to follow East Parrish Avenue. With its southeasterly course through Daviess, northeastern Ohio, and northwestern Grayson Counties, KY 54 connects Owensboro to Leitchfield, while also serving the smaller communities of Philpot, Whitesville and Fordsville.

In Owensboro proper, the route has over the years been straightened and widened, particularly toward the eastern reaches of the city.  From Leitchfield Road to Kentucky Route 1456 (also known as Thruston-Dermont Road and Millers Mill Road), the highway is five lanes wide and serves as the backbone of the growing retail and service area which has grown up in the area surrounding the highway's interchange with the Wendell H. Ford Expressway (US 60 and US 231). Where between KY 2831 and KY 1456, KY 54 is designated as a state primary road.

Not only does the road's number equal its rounded mileage, each of the three counties through which it passes (Daviess, Ohio and Grayson) have 18 of the 54 miles.

Major intersections

References

0054